Mandheling can mean two things:

 It is an alternative spelling of the name Mandailing, an ethnic group from Sumatra, Indonesia
 It is the name of coffee variety from Sumatra